The Roman Catholic Diocese of Chimbote is a diocese located in the city of Chimbote in the Ecclesiastical province of Trujillo in Peru.

History
On 26 November 1962 Pope John XXIII established the Territorial Prelature of Chimbote.  It was promoted to the Diocese of Chimbote by Pope John Paul II on 6 April 1983.

Bishops

Prelates of Chimbote
 James Edward Charles Burke, O.P. (1965-1978)
 Luis Armando Bambarén Gastelumendi, S.J. (1978-1983);  see below

Bishops of Chimbote
 Luis Armando Bambarén Gastelumendi, S.J. (1983-2004);  see above
 Ángel Francisco Simón Piorno (2004–Present)

See also
Roman Catholicism in Peru

References

Roman Catholic dioceses in Peru
Roman Catholic Ecclesiastical Province of Trujillo
Christian organizations established in 1962
Roman Catholic dioceses and prelatures established in the 20th century
1962 establishments in Peru